Unfortunately, Terror Jr is the debut studio album by American pop duo Terror Jr, released on January 25, 2019, through Effess and Atlantic Records. It was supported by the singles "Heaven Wasn't Made for Me", "A-OK (Everything's Perfect)", and "Terrified".

Background
David Singer-Vine revealed that the duo started out with over 100 songs, and in order to reduce the number to 15, they kept only those that "closely represented who they wanted to be in terms of future growth", with Singer-Vine stating "We want to be great. [...] These songs on this album, it's a departure in a sense of the scale of it all. I think this is the grandest we've appeared." The process took over a year, and the duo said in a press release that "There are no soft moments on our album and that's intentional... We don't want to be background music... The point is to engage. We hope that people listen to these songs with questions and come out with answers."

Lisa Vitale said of the album title: "I kind of think of it as the signature at the end of a letter. It's signed from us to the world. There is a bit of darkness and melancholy to a lot of the songs and to the state of the world right now. Even though they sound happy, when you look closely, it's a reflection on how we feel."

Critical reception
Newsweek called the album "a bubblegum ode to modern culture" that includes "blunt statements on politics", "a blatant Trump mention", and "deep, eerie and melancholy messages and images" that "defines" the duo "as something larger than pop as we know it". Highsnobiety called the album "delicious" and "even juicier than you could have imagined". Billboard said the album features "the duo combining their danceable sound with sociopolitical themes, such as women's reproductive rights, LGBT rights and substance abuse", highlighting the line "These days got me in a slump/ White women voted for Trump" in "A-OK (Everything's Perfect)". Paper called the song "Pretty" a "dark, contemptuous take on the ennui of living in a female body", saying it "feels refreshing and rebellious".

Track listing
Track listing adapted from AllMusic.

References

2019 debut albums
Atlantic Records albums
Terror Jr albums